Donald Crowe, (December 20, 1919 – March 16, 1978) was a Canadian football player who played for the Ottawa Rough Riders and Toronto Argonauts. He won the Grey Cup with the Rough Riders in 1951. Crowe grew up in Toronto and attended Danforth Technical High School, playing junior football there. He also previously played football with the Peterborough Orfuns and the Toronto Balmy Beach Beachers of the Ontario Rugby Football Union. Crowe also played lacrosse and ice hockey for the Peterborough Petes and Canadian Army teams. A Royal Canadian Air Force veteran, Crowe was the a co-captain of the Toronto RCAF Hurricanes team that won the 30th Grey Cup in 1942. In 1999, Crowe was inducted into the Peterborough & District Sports Hall of Fame.

References

1919 births
1978 deaths
Ottawa Rough Riders players
Toronto Argonauts players
Canadian football people from Toronto
Players of Canadian football from Ontario